Francesco Antonio Begnudelli-Basso (born at Trento; died at Freising, 9 October 1713) was an Austrian  canon lawyer.

Life
From 1675 he was Vicar-General of the Diocese of Trent, his native place. In 1679, however, he held a canonry in Freising Cathedral, where in 1696 he became vicar-general of the diocese, and where he died.

Works

His "Bibliotheca juris canonico-civilis practica seu repertoium quaestionum magis practicarum in utroque foro" established him among the canonists of his day. He speaks in the clearest terms of papal infallibility. The work was published in Freising in 1712, for vols. in folio; Geneva, 1747; Modena and Venice, 1758. It was made effectively obsolete by later editions of Lucius Ferraris's "Bibliotheca".

References

Attribution

1713 deaths
17th-century Austrian lawyers
Canon law jurists
Year of birth unknown
18th-century Austrian lawyers